McDonald High School is a public high school in McDonald, Ohio, located in Trumbull County.  It is the only high school in the McDonald Local School District.

Ohio High School Athletic Association State Championships

Boys Cross Country – 1982, 1983, 1999, 2001, 2004, 2011, 2013
Boys Track and Field – 1999, 2011
Girls Cross Country – 2014
Girls Track and Field – 2014

References

External links

High schools in Trumbull County, Ohio
Public high schools in Ohio